This is a history of the Tonga national rugby league team.

Foundation years
Rugby league first gained attention in Tonga when the Pacific Cup competition would be partially held in the country during 1986. After this initial exposure to the Tongan people several clubs began to form or switch from rugby union to rugby league and by 1988 the nation had enough depth in their player pool to begin playing national fixtures and would decide to enter the 1988 Pacific Cup competition held in neighbouring Samoa in their capital Apia.

During that Pacific Cup the Tongans would play in three fixtures winning a sole match against the American Samoans 38-14 that would double as their first international victory; the team would however fail to win their other two matches against Western Samoa 40-30 and the New Zealand Maori 42–16.

Road to maiden Pacific Cup title
Over the next two years the national side sporadically played international fixtures but it would not be until the 1992 Pacific Cup when they would again begin playing with some regularity. At the 1992 Cup competition the side would show significant improvement on their previous inaugural cup effort with victories over Niue, Cook Islands, Fiji and the New Zealand Maori. This run of victories would earn them a place in the final of the 1992 Pacific Cup against the Western Samoan side but they would eventually lose a close fought match by four points 18–14. The following tournament two years later would see the Tongan side show further improvement with several comfortable victories again earning them a spot in final of the Pacific Cup this time against the Fijians who had never defeated the Tongans at that time. The final would be a tough affair but the Mate Ma'a would again be victorious over Fiji 34-11 and would claim their maiden Pacific Cup title.

1995 World Cup
During 1995 Tonga qualified for their first World Cup that year and were seeded in the strong group B with both New Zealand and Papua New Guinea. While Tonga failed to win a match at the World Cup they earned copious amounts of respect after they only narrowly lost to the New Zealand team by a single point and earn a draw against Papua New Guinea.

Between World Cups
The next four years saw the Tongan side appear in a further Pacific Cup in 1997 and then qualify for the 2000 World Cup with comfortable victories over the Cook Islands, Tokelau and American Samoa. Prior to appearing at the 2000 competition the Tongans arranged a friendly fixture against the New Zealand side that they had come so close to defeating during the previous World Cup but this time sustained their heaviest defeat to date going down 74-0 and suffering a large dent in confidence prior to the competition.

2000 World Cup
After the heavy defeat to New Zealand their next international fixture would be during their second World Cup where the Tongans would again be placed in another tough group with France, Papua New Guinea again and the South Africans. Tonga would face South Africa in their first match of the tournament where they would be comfortable victors in a 66-18 drubbing, however the rest of the tournament would not be so kind to the Tongan side with losses to both France and Papua New Guinea meaning the Tongans would again fail to make it past the first stage of the tournament.

Second Pacific Cup title
With a disappointing World Cup behind them the Mate Ma'a regrouped and again entered the Pacific Cup four years later in 2004. The tournament saw the Tongans again qualify for the tournament final with victories over both the Cook Islands and Fiji but the side would suffer a heavy defeat at the hands of neighbouring Samoa 51–18. 2006 saw the Tongan side re-enter the Pacific Cup where again they performed strongly qualifying for their second consecutive final where this time they reversed their previous effort with a strong victory over Fiji 22-4 giving them their second Pacific Cup title.

Federation Shield, World Cup Qualification
2006 would continue to be a busy year of international fixtures for the Tongans which saw them gain qualification into the 2008 World Cup after they would finish top of their Pacific group ahead of the Cook Islands, Fiji and Samoa and then defeat the Samoans 18–10 in the qualifying final. They would also enter the inaugural Federation Shield competition along with England, France and Samoa and eventually finish second to the English in a tough final which would eventually end 32-14 and saw several Tongan players sin binned. During the tournament they also achieved a good victory over neighbouring Samoa and a surprising victory over the French that also saw them take their fourth place world ranking.

War Cry
The Tongan war cry, the Sipi Tau is accompanied by a traditional dance similar in style to the New Zealand Haka.

Mate Ma'a Tonga War Cry

Teu tangi atu pe!
Ko e 'aho!
Ko e 'aho mavava mo e tangi!
Teu mate maa Tonga!
Hi!
 
Tonga 'e!
Ta kau to'a!
Katoa pe!
Tan Ki Tonga kota!
Ha'u!
Hii
Teu ketau folau!
 
Hii! Haa!
Ke fesi!
Mo laiki!
Kotoa he tau!
 
Tau malohi!
'Ai Malohi!
Tau Fefeka!
'Ai Fefeka!
 
Tau ki Tonga!
To'o mo e hi!
Hi!
Mate Ma'a Tonga War Cry (FULL)

Teu to ki he tupe!
Ko e 'aho!
Ko e 'aho mavava mo e tangi!
Teu mate maa Tonga!
Hi!
 
Tonga 'e!
Ta ke hu ki ai!
Katoa pe!
Taha!
Mo e to kotoa!
Teu fetau folau!
 
Hii! Haa!
Mo e pese!
Mo e lea!
'Otua ke tau!
 
Tau malohi!
'Ai Malohi!
Tau Fefeka!
'Ai Fefeka!
 
Tau ki Tonga!
To'o mo e hii!
Tau mo tangi!
'I 'olunga moihulo!
Feinga te tau 'ikuna!
'Ikuna kotoa!
Hi!

See also

Tongan National Rugby League
Tonga women's national rugby league team
Tonga National Rugby League
Tonga national rugby league team
Rugby league in Tonga

References

External links
Tongan Rugby League history

Rugby league in Tonga
Tonga national rugby league team
Tonga national rugby league team
History of organisations based in Tonga